Adabay River is a river of central Ethiopia which, along with the Wanchet River, defined the former district of Marra Biete. Its tributaries include the Chacha, the Beresa, and three other 
streams which join together at the top of a deep canyon.

References 

Nile basin
Rivers of Ethiopia